Nematalosa is a genus of gizzard shads in the fish family Clupeidae.  There are currently 11 recognized species.

Species
 Nematalosa arabica Regan, 1917 (Arabian gizzard shad)
 Nematalosa come (J. Richardson, 1846) (Western Pacific gizzard shad)
 Nematalosa erebi (Günther, 1868) (Australian river gizzard shad)
 Nematalosa flyensis Wongratana, 1983 (Fly River gizzard shad)
 Nematalosa galatheae G. J. Nelson & Rothman, 1973 (Galathea gizzard shad)
 Nematalosa japonica Regan, 1917 (Japanese gizzard shad)
 Nematalosa nasus (Bloch, 1795) (Bloch's gizzard shad)
 Nematalosa papuensis (Munro, 1964) (Strickland River gizzard shad)
 Nematalosa persara G. J. Nelson & McCarthy, 1995
 Nematalosa resticularia G. J. Nelson & McCarthy, 1995
 Nematalosa vlaminghi (Munro, 1956) (Western Australian gizzard shad)

References
 

Clupeidae
Ray-finned fish genera
Taxa named by Charles Tate Regan